Cape San Antonio, or in Spanish Cabo San Antonio, is a cape extending into the Atlantic Ocean on the eastern coast of Buenos Aires Province in eastern Argentina.  It lies south of Samborombón Bay.

Notes

References
Merriam-Webster's Geographical Dictionary, Third Edition. Springfield, Massachusetts: Merriam-Webster, Incorporated, 1997.

San Antonio
Landforms of Buenos Aires Province